Frederik Vilhelm Conrad Holck (1745–1800) was a Danish nobleman and courtier.

Biography
Holck was the son of Major General Christian Christopher Holck  til Orebygård  (1698–1774) and Ermegaard Sophie Winterfeldt (1702–56). He was raised on the family estate  at Guldborgsund. He came to court as a chamber page at a young age. Holck was a favorite companion of king Christian VII of Denmark during the first years of his reign, and were regarded to have a bad influence upon the monarch by encouraging him in decadent pleasures and by distancing him from his consort Queen Caroline Matilda

He was appointed Chamberlain in 1767 and Privy Councilor (geheimeråd) in 1769.

In 1770, however, he was removed from court upon the influence of royal physician Johann Friedrich Struensee and replaced by Royal Chamberlain Enevold Brandt. In 1789, he obtained the office of county governor over Kiel, Cronshagen and Bordesholm. The remainder of his life was spent at  Kiel where he died in 1800.

References 

Court of Christian VII of Denmark
Danish royal favourites
Danish nobility
18th-century Danish people
1745 births
1800 deaths
Danish courtiers
Knights of the Order of the Dannebrog